Tosh Basco, known by her performance name boychild (stylized in lowercase), is an American performance artist, dancer, and photographer. boychild identifies as nonbinary trans, but considered her persona of boychild to be female and uses she/her pronouns when performing. By inhabiting female pronouns whilst preforming while sustaining a nonbinary identity, boychild is "non-conformist to hegemonic ideas of sex and gender, boychild is positioned as subordinated other in more ways than one and the viability of her sex, gender, and humanness is called into question." boychild's performances relay how bodies have been thrown into arbitrary categoricalness that reiforces cisheteronortmative benefit from these classifications."She uses her body as a vehicle for performing. The "body has become a form of political subject and considered a heart of power" The body is the physical embodiment of "the self", which "can be used as a tool to reveal the ubiquitous wholeness of being—dissolving difference." Her choreography, she told Interview Magazine, is like "the physical body turning into a cyborg ... It’s like a glitch; there’s a repetitive thing that happens." Performances of boychild's often consist of lip-syncs to heavily distorted pop songs. Her signature style includes a shaved head, full-body makeup, tinted contact lenses, and neon lighting. She lives and works predominately in California and Hong Kong.

Work 
boychild was born in Sacramento, California and grew up in San Francisco during the 1990s. She experimented with drag at an early age and cites Dia Dear as an early influence. boychild began performing with her persona in 2012 in the San Francisco drag scene. San Francisco is home to the first "gay riot" that broke out in August 1966 when drag queens dining at Compton's Cafeteria on Turk Street fought back against police harassment. This riot proceeded the Stonewall Rebellion in New York City that would take place three years later. Moreover, boychild states that she is not exactly a drag queen, but her persona offers truth to the notion that "trans drag performers expand the possibilities of drag altogether". boychild states that the birth of the Boychild persona occurred during months of research into clowns, healers, and non-western cultures, medicine men, shamans, witches. boychild says "by research into ‘shamans and the role they played as the healer, knower, medicineman, jester. I found in various cultures … a person who used knowledge, cunning, humour, and wisdom to heal; whether through medicine, psychic insight, comedic performances, rituals or a combination of all these things."

Performances by boychild are sci-fi in aesthetic and nature. boychild uses posthuman performance strategies to communicate meaning through combinations of body, voice and technology. boychild's performances often reference idea of cyborgs, which plays with the hybrid of machine and organism and becomes a creature of social reality and fiction.  They "inhabit a kind of queer flesh that vibrates out-with the humanly-accessible spectrum, as if you were suddenly able to see ultra-violet, or heat, in some sort of politicised cyborg becoming that overwhelms your senses." Some of her performances are one-time-only, providing this intense immersement in the performances while it is occurring. boychild emphasizes that working in nightlife scene is crucial because "nothing contextualizes [my] performance the same way as these places do. It’s my world, my existence in the underground." Additionally, with their adolescence occurring post internet, they spent time finding things on there, reporting that the "underground exist on the internet." These physical spaces give space for "excitingly queer, non-binary corporeality of the protagonist(s)" that showcase new examples of identities who will inspire future generations that will inspire trans-inclusive feminist contributions to the art community.

boychild walked in Hood By Air's 2013 spring/summer show with signature white-out contacts lenses and glowing mouthpieces alongside A$AP Rocky. Later that year, boychild toured with singer Mykki Blanco and began collaborating with multimedia polymath Wu Tsang.

boychild's collaboration with Wu Tsang has led to numerous performances, videos, and other projects, such as Moved by the Motion, which includes cellist Patrick Belaga, dancer Josh Johnson, electronic musician Asma Maroof, and poet Fred Moten. boychild and Wu Tsang are longstanding collaborators. Wus Tsang, primarily a filmmaker, and boychild's, primarily a performer,  work seem fit within the other's contour which has propagated their sustained work together and provide audience members opportunity to experience queerer worlds. Wu Tsang works to look at "the way fantasy plays in representing social movements. Evoking “the underground” as a site of cultural resistance, he considers how these constructs have been transformed by the internet and social media." The underground and the internet are two spaces where boychild first took on her performative identity.

boychild's performances have been presented at the Gropius Bau, the Venice Biennale, the Sydney Biennial, the Whitney Museum of American Art, MoMA PS1, the San Francisco Museum of Modern Art, the Museum of Contemporary Art, Chicago, Museum of Contemporary Art, Los Angeles, the Stedelijk Museum in Amsterdam, ICA London, and Berghain.

#Untitled Lip-Syncs 
Many of boychild's performances are a part of her #Untitled Lip-Sync series. #Untitled Lip-Sync 2 begins in complete darkness. Eventually, three red lights begin flashing to form a triangle shape that illuminates boychild's head. One light is held in boychild's mouth, while the other two are held in each of her hands. A spotlight shines on boychild, which reveals that she is tangled in ropes and has white paint on her face. The performance displays boychild struggling against the constraint of the ropes, symbolizing the struggle that occurs from acts of pain, hate, anger, and desire towards queer people.

Many of boychild's lip-syncs use similar elements to those in #Untitled Lip-Sync 2, like lights and paint, to accompany the movement and music in the performance.

References 

American performance artists
Artists from San Francisco
Living people
Year of birth missing (living people)